Nikki Gore (born 11 December 2000) is an Australian rules footballer playing for Fremantle in the AFL Women's (AFLW) competition. She previously played for Adelaide.

State football
Gore played Australian rules football since the age of 11, first at McLaren and then joined Christies Beach She captained Christies Beach under-14 boys' team in 2014 and in 2016 joined their senior South Australian Women's Football League (SAWFL) side, helping them claim the Adelaide Footy League Division 2 premiership in 2017. In 2018, Gore joined SANFL Women's League (SANFLW) club South Adelaide. She had a very successful first season, averaging 19.5 disposals over eight games, as well as collecting 21 disposals and laying eight tackles in the Grand Final victory over Norwood. In round 4, after collecting 20 disposals, she was nominated for the Breakthrough Player Award, winning the award at the end of the season. Furthermore, she was selected for the 2018 SANFLW Team of the Year and won South Adelaide's best and fairest award. Gore represented South Australia at the 2018 AFL Women's Under 18 Championships and was selected for the initial squad of the All-Australian team. In 2019, Gore averaged 18 disposals over seven games, laying 48 tackles during the SANFLW season, helping South Adelaide claim back-to-back premierships. Gore also played two games for NT Thunder during the 2018 VFL Women's (VFLW) season.

AFL Women's career
Gore was drafted by Adelaide with their first selection and eighth overall in the 2018 AFL Women's draft. Adelaide's general manager of football, Phil Harper, said that she "is a real competitor who loves the contest, tackles hard, and has an enormous work rate."

In June 2022, Gore was traded to Fremantle.

Personal life
Gore was born in Christies Beach in Adelaide. She has a twin sister, named Amy, who is a surfer. Both twins had started out surfing, but Gore changed to football due to not enjoying the individual aspect of surfing. Both twins studied at Tatachilla Lutheran College until year nine, when they took up online schooling.

References

External links
 

Christies Beach Football Club players
South Adelaide Football Club players (Women's)
Living people
2000 births
Adelaide Football Club (AFLW) players
Australian rules footballers from South Australia
Fremantle Football Club (AFLW) players